The Comedy Sale was a short-lived Australian sketch comedy television series, which screened on the Seven Network in 1993. The series featured comedy sketches taking place in a suburban in a suburban shopping mall.

Cast
 Colin Lane
 Frank Woodley
 Robyn Butler	
 Mikey Robins
 Daina Reid
 Celia Ireland
 Ross Daniels
 Jeanette Cronin
 Steve Abbott	
 The Sandman 
 Scott Casley
 Umbilical Bros - David Collins and Shane Dundas
 Imelda Corcoran

References

External links

Australian television sketch shows
Nine Network original programming
1993 Australian television series debuts
1993 Australian television series endings